The Raid on Bone was a hit and run operation by the Knights of St Stephen and Tuscan troops against the Algerian town of Bône in 1607.

470 Muslims were killed and 1,464 captured as prisoners.

References

Bone
Annaba
17th century in Algeria
1607 in Africa